Vera'a , formerly known by its Mota name Vatrata, is an Oceanic language spoken on the western coast of Vanua Lava Island, in the Banks Islands of northern Vanuatu.

Vera'a was described in 2011 by linguist Stefan Schnell.

Name 
The language Vera'a is named after the village where it is spoken. These names ultimately reflect a protoform *βaturata in Proto-Torres-Banks — literally "flat stone": *βatu "stone" (<  *patu) + *rata "flat" (<  *rataR <  *dataR).

Recent history 
According to recently recorded oral local history, Vanua Lava was struck by a major earthquake and landslide in 1945 that devastated gardens and hamlets on its north-west coast, as a result of which the Vera'a community abandoned its previous settlements and resettled to its current main center of residence, the village of Vera'a (Vatrata). Vera'a is located about 4 km from the village of Vetuboso, the largest settlement on Vanua Lava that is inhabited mainly by speakers of the closely related language Vurës.

Together with speakers of Vera'a, speakers of the now moribund language Lemerig moved to the village of Vera'a. Lemerig is remembered by many residents of Vera'a, but is no longer used in everyday communication. It is likely that the now de facto loss of the Lemerig language is the result of natural disaster and subsequent resettlement movements.

Phonology
Vera'a has 7 phonemic vowels, which are all short monophthongs:

Possession 
In Vera'a there are two types of possessive constructions recorded, that of direct possessive constructions and indirect possessive constructions. Similar to other Oceanic languages, the distinctions between directly and indirectly possessed nouns in Vera'a appear to generally correspond to the semantic distinctions seen between inalienable and alienable possession.

In both direct and indirect possessive constructions there are a further three construction sub-types based on the expression of the possessor. The three types of possessor constructions are as follows:

 possessor as a pronoun expressed by a possessive suffix
 possessor as a personal NP
 possessor as a common noun

In order to express the possessor as a pronoun, possessive suffixes are used. Stefan Schnell reports that they “are considered pronominal in nature because they have specific, definite referents and inflect for the same categories as personal pronouns.”

Direct Possession 
In Vera'a, direct possession primarily expresses inalienable or inherently given relationships.

These types of relationships can be seen through expression of:

 kinship relations
 body parts 
 other types of part/whole relations (often parts of plants) 
 certain concepts that only occur in association with another concept (name of an entity) 
 spatial relations (incl. temporal relations expressed in analogy to spatial relations)

Direct Possessive Construction 
Direct possessive constructions consist of the possessum, that of which is being possessed, and the possessor. This structure tends to follow a possessum-possessor order. The possessum is expressed as a bound noun while the possessor can be expressed as either:

 a pronoun (expressed by a possessive suffix)
 a personal NP linked to the possessum by the linking suffix -n 
 as a common noun adjacently following the possessum noun

The bound noun possessum will take one of these three possessor constructions as shown below:

(1)   Direct possessive construction with a pronominal possessor

(2)   Direct possessive construction with a personal NP possessor

(3) Direct possessive construction with a common NP possessor

In summary the constructions can be described as follows:

Indirect possession 
Indirect possessive constructions primarily express alienable possession, that is a possession that is more easily terminated. The possessor is not directly expressed on the possessum noun, rather the possessor is expressed on a possessive classifier. This construction results in the possessum and the possessor being less morphologically dependent on one another. Consequently, this construction allows for the possessor to appear in different positions syntactically and for the possessor to be able to form a standalone NP with the possessum NP being omitted from speech.

Indirect possessive constructions are divided further into two types, labelled Indirect Possessive Construction Type 1 and Type 2 respectively. In addition to both types, indirect possessive constructions also have several different functions, those being the anaphoric/generic use of a classifier (elided NP), the adnominal recipient construction and recipient / beneficiary construction. The different functions of indirect possessive constructions are further explained in Stefan Schnell's A Grammar of Vera'a: an Oceanic language of North Vanuatu, chapter 6.

Indirect Possessive Construction 
In an indirect possessive construction, the possessum is a free noun and the possessor is hosted by a possessive classifier which mediates the syntactic relation between the possessed and possessor. There are eight possessive classifiers that each express their own respective function and the types of relations that indirect possessive constructions express.

Indirect Possessive Construction Type 1 
In the Indirect Possessive Construction Type 1, the possessive classifier is expressed as a bound morpheme with the possessor being expressed as either:

 a possessive suffix attached to the classifier
 a personal NP linked to the possessive classifier with the -n suffix
 as a common noun adjacently following the possessive classifier.

The possessive classifier will take one of these three possessor constructions as shown below:

(1)   Indirect possessive construction Type 1 with a pronominal possessor

(2)   Indirect possessive construction Type 1 with a personal NP possessor

(3)   Indirect possessive construction Type 1 with a common NP possessor

In summary the constructions are as follows:

Indirect Possessive Construction Type 2 
In an Indirect Possessive Construction of Type 2, the possessive classifier precedes the possessed noun. The result of this, is that the possessive classifier and the possessum form a complex NP. The possessor is exclusively expressed by a pronominal possessive suffix.

Indirect Possessive Construction Type 2

In summary the construction is as follows:

References

Bibliography

Main reference

Other references

External links
 Audio recordings in the Vera'a language, in open access, by linguist A. François (source: Pangloss Collection).
 Audio recordings in the Vera'a language, in open access, by linguist S. Schnell (source: Language Archive Cologne).
 Vorēs, Makson & Stefan Schnell. 2012. N'erē kakaka 'a Vera'a – Ol storian blong Vera'a – Stories from the village of Vera'a (Vanua Lava, TorBa), in open access, by Stefan Schnell and Makson Vorēs.
 Vera'a DoReCo corpus compiled by Stefan Schnell. Audio recordings of narrative texts with transcriptions time-aligned at the phone level, translations, and time-aligned morphological annotations.

Banks–Torres languages
Languages of Vanuatu
Definitely endangered languages